Wim Meijer may refer to:

 Wim Meijer (Pacifist Socialist Party) (1923–2001), Dutch politician
 Wim Meijer (Labour Party) (born 1939), Dutch politician